The  is an Asia League Ice Hockey team based in Nikkō, Tochigi, Japan.

Logo design: The word IceBucks in italicized English in black with white trim, with the words "NIKKO KOBE" in bold italics in orange trimmed with white

Mascot: An orange and white furred male deer wearing a hockey helmet.

History

The Nikkō area has a long history of ice hockey, with the Furukawa Electric semi-professional team (one of the oldest in Japan) having been established in 1925, and becoming a founding member of the Japanese Ice Hockey League in 1966. In 1999, however, the team was forced to disband due to financial difficulties.

A outflow of support from the city and local financing allowed the team to be recreated as a club team, supported locally. It was renamed the HC Nikkō IceBucks and joined the league in time for the next season's start. The team, despite fervent local support, was never one of the successes of the JIHL even when they were supported as Furukawa Electric, and had a rocky start as the HC Nikkō IceBucks, having to relaunch their business model in 2001. The team has consistently placed near or at the bottom of the league.

When the league expanded into the Asia League Ice Hockey, Nikkō was one of the teams that was part of the new league.  In the summer of 2005, the team arranged to play a number of its home games in Kobe, Hyogo, and changed its name to the Nikkō Kobe IceBucks to reflect its new two-city home. In 2007–2008 season Kobe is no longer home and the name was reverted to the older HC Nikkō Ice Bucks.

On January 29, 2020, It was announce that five players would represent Japan in the 3rd round of qualifiers for the 2022 Beijing Olympics.

Honours
Japan League championships: none
Asia League championships: none
All Japan Ice hockey Championship: 2015, 2019

Year-by-year record

JIHL 1999–2004

ALIH 2003–present
complete records for previous seasons

*prior to the 2008–2009 season, there were no shoot-outs and games ended in a tie

Current roster

|}

Past import players
 Curt Bennett 1980–82, F
 Harvey Bennett, Jr. 1980–82, D
 Eduard Novák 1982–84, F
 Frantisek Kaberle Sr. 1982–84, D (Father of Frantisek Kaberle and Tomas Kaberle)
 Patrik Degerstedt 1999–2001
 Martin Kariya 2004–05, LW (Brother of Paul Kariya and Steve Kariya)
 Shjon Podein 2005–06, LW 
 Chris Paradise 2005–06, C
 Mike Henderson 2006–07, RW
 Eric LaFreniere 2008–09, RW
 Mickey Gilchrist 2008–09, C
 Bud Smith 2009–11, C
 Richard Rochefort 2010–11, D/C
 Andrew Kozek 2011–12, LW
 Petteri Nummelin 2017-18, D

References

External links
Official website 

Asia League Ice Hockey teams
Ice hockey teams in Japan
Nikkō, Tochigi
Sports teams in Tochigi Prefecture